Leonard White (5 November 1916 – 2 January 2016) was a British actor and television producer. In the latter role he was responsible for The Avengers and Armchair Theatre.

Early life 
White was born in Newhaven, East Sussex. His father was a bookmaker and racehorse owner, and his mother ran a wholesale newsagents business. He was introduced to acting by the headmaster of his school, who ran a boys' Shakespearean acting troupe.

Career
After leaving school, White pursued a career as a stage actor in London. Initially, he supported himself with a clerical job while performing with the Tavistock Repertory Company (now the Tower Theatre Company). During World War II, he served in the British Army in Signals; following the end of World War II in Europe, he did the remainder of his service acting in plays produced by the Army Bureau of Current Affairs. On being demobilised in 1946, he made the transition to full-time professional acting. In 1951 he was one of the original leads of Christopher Fry's A Sleep of Prisoners, alongside Denholm Elliott, Stanley Baker, and Hugh Pryse.

From acting he turned his hand to directing, which led to his career as a television producer. In 1957, he completed a training course for television producer/directors run by the Canadian CBC Television. In 1960, Sydney Newman, a former CBC producer who had moved to Britain to work for the ITV contractor ABC Weekend TV, invited him to join the company as an associate producer. White's credits include Police Surgeon and its spin-off The Avengers, which he co-created with Newman, as well as many episodes of the anthology series Out of This World, Armchair Theatre and ITV Playhouse.

Memoirs 
He published a memoir, Armchair Theatre: The Lost Years, in 2003, and the first volume of his autobiography, Many Moons and a Few Stars, in 2010.

Death
White died in the Abundant Grace nursing home in Seaford, East Sussex on 2 January 2016. He was survived by a niece and five grandchildren,  and one great-grandson.

References

External links
 
 Leonard White  Filmography at BFI website
 Obituary/ Funeral tributes: Independent, Telegraph, HorseyTalk, Big Finish, The Brighton Argos, Herald Scotland, Sussex Express,  
 Leonard talks about the influence of his Headmaster, Ernest J. Coker (2009) 
 Leonard reads an extract of a letter from Patrick Macnee, reflecting on the years at ABC

1916 births
2016 deaths
English television producers
English male film actors
English male television actors
English male stage actors
British Army personnel of World War II
People from Newhaven, East Sussex
The Avengers (TV series)